Batavia Union Football Club was an Indonesian football club based in North Jakarta, Jakarta. The team plays in Liga Indonesia Premier Division (LPIS).

Last squad

Former Coach
 Roberto Bianchi

See also
Persitara North Jakarta

References

External links
Batavia Union FC at divisiutama.co.id
Batavia Union FC at ligaprimerindonesia.co.id

North Jakarta
Football clubs in Indonesia
Defunct football clubs in Indonesia
Association football clubs established in 2010
2010 establishments in Indonesia
Association football clubs disestablished in 2011
2011 disestablishments in Indonesia